Mesocolpia subcomosa is a moth in the family Geometridae. It is found on São Tomé.

Its forewings are pale greenish wish darker green waved cross-lines.

References

External links

Moths described in 1901
Eupitheciini
Moths of Africa